Benjamin Gerard Coyle-Larner (born 6 October 1994), known professionally as Loyle Carner, is an English hip hop musician. After supporting various rappers during their tours, he released his debut album, Yesterday's Gone, in 2017, which garnered a nomination for the 2017 Mercury Prize. He released his second album, Not Waving, but Drowning, in April 2019. Carner has been nominated for three Brit Awards.

Early life
Benjamin Gerard Coyle-Larner was born on 6 October 1994 in Lambeth, South London. He and his younger brother, Ryan, were raised in South Croydon by his mother, Jean, a teacher of children with learning difficulties, and his stepfather, Nik. He has had minimal contact with his father, who is of Guyanese descent. Carner is mixed race. His stage name is a spoonerism of his double-barrelled surname as well as a reference to his childhood struggle with his ADHD and dyslexia diagnoses.

At the age of 13, Carner portrayed a small role in the 2008 film 10,000 BC. He started his secondary education at Whitgift School in South Croydon, having secured a scholarship, and moved on to study at the Brit School, and began studying for an acting degree at the Drama Centre. In 2014, he dropped out of the Drama Centre after his stepfather died of sudden unexpected death in epilepsy (SUDEP), deciding to focus on his music.

Music career
Carner played his first official gig at The Button Factory in Dublin, Ireland in October 2012 supporting rapper MF Doom. He released his first extended play in September 2014, titled A Little Late, which was well received by music critics. Loyle Carner supported American rapper Joey Badass on his UK tour and went on to play the 2015 UK festival season, including Glastonbury Festival. He played on Huw Stephens' BBC Radio 1 show as part of their Piano Sessions series in October of that year. Carner was included in the BBC's Sound of 2016 list. In August 2016, he supported American rapper Nas in his show at the O2 Academy Bristol. Later in the year, he collaborated with poet Kae Tempest for a performance.

Carner's debut album, entitled Yesterday's Gone, was released on 20 January 2017. It garnered acclaim from music critics, with The Independent naming it the album of the year. The album was nominated for the 2017 Mercury Prize, which was won by Sampha for Process. In 2018, he received two respective Brit Award nominations for British Breakthrough Act and British Male Solo Artist. He was scheduled to perform on BBC Radio 1 in February 2018 but cancelled due to a disagreement over cover song choices. Loyle Carner's sophomore album, Not Waving, but Drowning, was released on 19 April 2019. On 30 June, he performed as part of the year's Glastonbury Festival on its Other Stage, marking his second appearance after playing the John Peel Stage the year before. The song "Angel" was listed as part of the FIFA 20 soundtrack playlist. In 2020, Carner and his brother co-directed a music video for the song "Eugene" by Arlo Parks.

Artistry
Carner employs a "languid" style of rapping. His sound has been described as "confessional hip-hop", "introspective", "jazz-infused", as well as "sensitive and eloquent". He cites American hip hop and grime music as musical influences. He also regards American poet Langston Hughes and British writer Benjamin Zephaniah as inspirations.

Personal life
As of January 2017, Carner lived in Croydon, South London with his mother and brother. He has one son, born in late 2020. He loves to cook and also runs a cooking school for children with ADHD called Chilli Con Carner. He has titled songs after chefs Yotam Ottolenghi and Antonio Carluccio. Carner has nut and sesame allergies. In 2018, he appeared in a film for a project by the charity organisation Campaign Against Living Miserably (CALM), which aims to prevent male suicide. The following year, he curated an art exhibition and donated its proceeds to CALM.

Carner is a supporter of Liverpool F.C. As a tribute to his stepfather, who idolised Eric Cantona and was a passionate Manchester United F.C. supporter, Carner released a song titled "Cantona". He also named his 2016 tour after Cantona, and has worn his stepfather's Cantona shirt during concerts. Carner used samples of songs written and performed by his stepfather alongside Misure La VerT for Yesterday's Gones hidden title track, which concludes the album.

Discography

Studio albums

Extended plays
 A Little Late (2014)

Singles

As a lead artist

As a featured artist

Other certified songs

Guest appearances

Accolades

References

External links

 
 

1994 births
Living people
21st-century British male singers
21st-century English singers
Black British male rappers
English male singer-songwriters
English people of Guyanese descent
People from Croydon
People from West Norwood
Musicians with dyslexia
Rappers from London
Drama Centre